The Cochran Municipal Building and School are two historic buildings in Cochran, Georgia. They are located at the intersection of Dykes Street (Georgia State Route 112/26) and Second Street (U.S. Route 23 Business), on the same block as the Bleckley County Courthouse.  The school was built in 1928 and the Municipal Building was built in 1942.  The Municipal Building was designed by Dennis and Dennis of Macon, Georgia, and was constructed by the Works Progress Administration.

The two buildings were added to the National Register of Historic Places on July 31, 2003.

See also
National Register of Historic Places listings in Bleckley County, Georgia

References

External links
 

Government buildings on the National Register of Historic Places in Georgia (U.S. state)
School buildings on the National Register of Historic Places in Georgia (U.S. state)
Buildings and structures in Bleckley County, Georgia
National Register of Historic Places in Bleckley County, Georgia
Colonial Revival architecture in Georgia (U.S. state)
School buildings completed in 1928
Bleckley County, Georgia
1928 establishments in Georgia (U.S. state)